is a Japanese footballer currently playing as a forward for Tokushima Vortis, on loan from Omiya Ardija.

Career statistics

Club
.

Notes

References

External links

2001 births
Living people
Sportspeople from Saitama Prefecture
Association football people from Saitama Prefecture
Japanese footballers
Japan youth international footballers
Association football forwards
J2 League players
Omiya Ardija players